Barpeta district {Pron:bə(r)ˈpeɪtə or bə(r)ˈpi:tə} is an administrative district in the state of Assam in India. The district headquarters are located at Barpeta.

History
Barpeta district was created in 1983 when it was split from Kamrup district. In 2020, Bajali subdivision was split from Barpeta to be a fully-fledged district.

Geography

Important villages and towns of the district

These are the important cities/towns of the district:

Barpeta
 The headquarters and the second largest town in the district. The town is surrounded by rivulets and canals from all directions. The important centre of attraction is the Barpeta satra established by Vaishnavite saint Madhabdev.
Howly
 The middle town of the district between Barpeta Road and Barpeta Town. It is a busy commercial town that is also known as the business capital of the district.
Barpeta Road
 The largest town of the district. It is a busy commercial town that is also known as the business capital of western Assam.
Sarbhog
 A small town along National Highway no. 31.
Bahari
It is situated in the southeast corner of Barpeta, near about 20 km away from the main town. Brahmaputra river flows on the southern side of Bahari. It is also the commercial hub for the entire southeastern part of the Barpeta district. Bahari is also famous for the Satra which is established by Mahapurux Sri Sri Haridev.
Sarthebari
 A small town known for its bell-metal works.
Kalgachia
 A Town in the west of the district
Barbhitha
 A village of the southwest border of Barpeta district.
 Mandia 
 Mandia is another town in the south part of the district.

Educational institutions
Kendriya Vidyalaya, Barpeta was opened on 1 April 2003 in the civil sector with 200 students spread over in classes I to V.The vidyalaya has been upgraded to class XII(Science Stream) in the session 2010–2011 with a total strength of 528.KV Barpeta is affiliated with CBSE.
Barbhitha High School, established in 1947, located in the southwestern part of Barpeta District
Padmapara High School, established in 1981, located in Padmapara village in the southeastern part of Barpeta district
K. K. Pathak High School, Kalgachia, established in 1975,located in Kalgachia town in the western part of Barpeta district
 Kishalay Shishu Niketan, Sarupeta, established in 1993 located in Sarupeta

Economy
In 2006 the Indian government named Barpeta one of the country's 250 most backward districts (out of a total of 640.) It is one of the eleven districts in Assam currently receiving funds from the Backward Regions Grant Fund Programme (BRGF.)

Divisions
There are eight Assam Legislative Assembly constituencies in this district: Barpeta, Baghbor, Bhawanipur, Chenga, Jania, Patacharkuchi, Sarukhetri, Sorbhog. Sorbhog is in the Kokrajhar Lok Sabha constituency, whilst the other seven are in the Barpeta Lok Sabha constituency.

Demographics

According to the 2011 census, the Barpeta district has a population of 1,693,622, roughly equal to the nation of Guinea-Bissau or the US state of Idaho. This gives it a ranking of 292nd in India (out of a total of 640.) Its population growth rate over the decade 2001–2011 was 21.4%. Barpeta has a sex ratio of 951 females for every 1000 males, and a literacy rate of 65.03%. With the divided district, the population is 1,439,806. Scheduled Castes and Scheduled Tribes make up 76,128 (5.29%) and 15,858 (1.10%) of the population respectively.

Languages

At the time of the 2011 census in the residual district, 68.89% of the population spoke Bengali, 29.39% Assamese and 1.03% Bodo as their first language.

Religions

In Barpeta district, as per the 2011 Indian census, Islam is the most followed religion with 1,117,033 (77.58%) adherents, while Hinduism is followed by 320,578 (22.27%) of the population. Small percentages of followers of Sikhism, Jainism and Buddhism are also present. Muslims are mainly rural and form over 83% of the rural population, while Hindus are majority in urban areas. Way back in 1971, Hindus were slight majority in Barpeta district with forming 51.1% of the population, while Muslims were 48.6% at that time.

References

External links
 Barpeta district official website

 
Districts of Assam
Minority Concentrated Districts in India
1983 establishments in Assam
Kamrup region